= Mason Headley, Lexington =

Neighborhood in Lexington, Kentucky

- Neighbourhood
- Location within Kentucky Location within the United States
- Coordinates: 38°03′6″N 84°54′6″W

Area
  - Total: 0.20 km^{2} (0.076 sq mi)

Population
  - Total: 411
  - Density: 2,100/km^{2} (5,400/sq mi)

Mason Headley is a neighborhood in southwestern Lexington, Kentucky, United States. Its boundaries are Mason Headley Road to the north, Laurel Hill Road to the south, Beacon Hill Drive to the west, and Cold Harbor Drive to the east.

Neighborhood statistics

- Area: 0.076 square miles (0.20 km^{2})
- Population: 411
- Population density: 5,414 people per square mile
- Median household income: $52,008
